Sainte-Lheurine is a commune in the Charente-Maritime department in the Nouvelle-Aquitaine region in southwestern France.

Location and economy 
The village centre with its church from the 12th century is situated on a small hill that overlooks the vineyards, patches of forest, and the wheat, maize and sunflower fields that characterize the local landscape. A number of scattered small hamlets and single farmsteads in the plains below belong to the commune.

Sainte-Lheurine lies in the "Petite Champagne", and the cultivation of grapes for the production of Cognac and Pineau is the predominant local economic activity, with much of the production sold to the large cognac producers in nearby Cognac.

Population

See also
Communes of the Charente-Maritime department

References

Communes of Charente-Maritime
Arrondissement of Jonzac
Charente-Maritime communes articles needing translation from French Wikipedia